North Springs (also North Spring) is an unincorporated community in northwestern Jackson County, Tennessee, United States.  It lies along Tennessee State Routes 56 and 151, northwest of the town of Gainesboro, the county seat of Jackson County.  Its elevation is 604 feet (184 m).

References

Unincorporated communities in Jackson County, Tennessee
Unincorporated communities in Tennessee